Os Ton Paradeiso (Greek: Ως Τον Παράδεισο; English: Until The Paradise) is the fifth studio album by Greek artist, Katy Garbi. It was released on 8 October 1993 by Sony Music Greece and soon certified gold, but after months received platinum certification, selling over 60,000 units*. The album was written by various artists and contains four songs written by Phoebus, marking their first studio collaboration. It also contains "Ellada, Hora Tou Fotos" with which she represented Greece at Eurovision Song Contest 1993, a remix of the track.

In 1993, platinum was the album whose sales exceeded 60,000 units.

Track listing

Singles 
The following singles were officially released to radio stations with music videos, except the song "Akouo Tin Kardoula Sou", and gained a lot of airplay.

"Ellada, Hora Tou Fotos" (Ελλάδα, Χώρα Του Φωτός; Greece, Land Of Light)
"Os Ton Paradeiso" (Ως Τον Παράδεισο; Until The Paradise)
"Nai, Iparho Ego" (Ναι, Υπάρχω Εγώ; Yes, I Exist)
"O Kafes" (Ο Καφές; The Coffee)
"Akouo Tin Kardoula Sou" (Ακούω Την Καρδούλα Σου; I Listen To Your Heart)
"Nterti" (Ντέρτι; Longing)

Credits
Credits adapted from liner notes.

Personnel 

 Ilias Achladiotis – orchestration, programming, keyboards (tracks: 7, 10)
 Charis Andreadis – orchestration, programming, keyboards (tracks: 11)
 Kostas Antonopoulos – second vocal (tracks: 7)
 Giannis Bithikotsis – bouzouki (tracks: 1, 7, 9) / cura (tracks: 1, 5, 10) / baglama (tracks: 9)
 Nikos Chatzopoulos – oud (tracks: 8) / violin (tracks: 2, 6, 8)
 Vasilis Gkinos – orchestration, programming, keyboards (tracks: 1, 4, 5, 6, 9)
 Stelios Goulielmos – backing vocals (tracks: 1, 4, 5, 6, 10)
 Antonis Gounaris – guitars (tracks: 1, 3, 5, 7, 9, 10) / cümbüş (tracks: 1) / oud (tracks: 3)
 Anna Ioannidou – backing vocals (tracks: 1, 4, 5, 6, 10)
 Giannis Ioannou – accordion (tracks: 2, 9)
 Sakis Katsatsos – bass (tracks: 3, 7, 10)
 Stella Konitopoulou – second vocal (tracks: 2, 8)
 Panagiotis Lallis – orchestration, programming, keyboards, guitars (tracks: 2, 8)
 Dafni Papatheodorou – backing vocals (tracks: 1, 4, 5, 6, 10)
 Orestis Plakidis – orchestration, programming, keyboards (tracks: 3)
 Spiros Spirakos – second vocal (tracks: 9)
 Charis Varthakouris – second vocal (tracks: 8)

Production 

 Giannis Doxas – art direction
 Giannis Doulamis – production manager
 Giannis Ioannidis (Digital Press Hellas) – mastering
 Kostas Kalimeris (Sierra studio) – sound engineer, mix engineer (tracks: 1, 3, 4, 6, 7, 9, 10, 11)
 Konstantinos Kaspiris – styling
 Panagiotis Lallis (Sierra studio) – sound engineer, mix engineer (tracks: 2, 8)
 Athina Lekakou – photographer
 Spiros Paschos – hair styling
 Olga Papaefthimiadou – make up
 Orestis Plakidis (Sierra studio) – mix engineer (tracks: 11)
 Sakis Trikis (Sierra studio) – sound engineer, mix engineer (tracks: 5)

References 

1993 albums
Katy Garbi albums
Greek-language albums
Sony Music Greece albums